M.E. LaZerte High School is a high school in Edmonton, Alberta, Canada in the north eastern Kilkenny neighbourhood. It is part of Edmonton Public Schools. The school's team name is the Voyageurs, which is also what they call the student body.

History
M.E. LaZerte High School was founded in 1969 as M.E. LaZerte Composite High School, and was named for Milton Ezra LaZerte. LaZerte spent 61 years in the education field in various municipal, provincial, federal and academic positions.

Demographics
As of the 2016–2017 school year the school's students came from more than 83 cultural backgrounds and spoke over 73 languages. This cultural diversity has been celebrated since 1997 with the annual Taste of LaZerte celebration. The 2016 event lasted one week and ended with a pot-luck lunch for 1000 people and two hours of cultural performances choreographed by the students.

Facilities
M.E. LaZerte consists of three linked buildings; a two-storey gymnasium block, a two-storey academic block, and a one-storey vocational block. The facilities include:
two gyms
weight room
five computer labs
three science labs
automotive shop
two construction labs
welding lab 
dance studio
digital arts studio
library

The school is adjacent to Londonderry Junior High School and to the Londonderry Fitness and Leisure Centre, which has a 25-metre pool, a fitness centre, an ice arena, and outdoor tennis courts. The three facilities share outdoor fields (three soccer fields, two baseball diamonds, two football/soccer fields, and a running track).

Programs
Regular: 1426 students
International Baccalaureate (IB) Certificate and full Diploma: 290 students in IB Certificate and 162 students in IB Diploma
Chinese (Mandarin) Bilingual: 91 students
Ukrainian International Bilingual: 7 students
Interactions (supports students with autism spectrum disorder): 13 students
Registered Apprentice Program (RAP) (part of the school year is spent working as an apprentice towards obtaining a trade ticket): number of students NA

Athletics

M. E. LaZerte competes in the 51-school Metro Edmonton High School Athletic Association region of the Alberta Schools' Athletic Association (ASAA), and enters 22 teams in the following sports:
Badminton
Basketball (boys' and girls' teams)
Cross Country
Football
Golf
Rugby (boys' and girls' teams)
Soccer (boys' and girls' teams)
Indoor Soccer (coed)
Swimming
Team Handball
Track & Field
Volleyball (boys' and girls' teams)
Wrestling

The school hosts an annual memorial basketball tournament in honour of former teacher and basketball coach Thom Elniski.

Notes

Provincial championships
 Boys' volleyball 1976

Racism incident controversy
A student-taken photo of students in M.E. LaZerte was posted with a racist caption on Snapchat on 11 February 2016. The student who posted the original Snapchat picture was expelled from the school.

The posting had been denounced on Twitter by another student at the school, who was then suspended for two days for having included the picture and its offensive caption. This student's lawyer successfully appealed to have the two-day suspension rescinded and removed from the student's permanent record, as "an unreasonable and gross overreaction".

Notable alumni
Mallan Roberts - Centre back for the Richmond Kickers
Shannon Szabados - Goaltender for Canada women's national ice hockey team

References

External links
M.E. Lazerte High School

High schools in Edmonton
International Baccalaureate schools in Alberta
Educational institutions established in 1969
1969 establishments in Alberta